The 2023 New Jersey Generals season is scheduled to be the second season for the New Jersey Generals as a professional American football franchise and their first under general manager Billy Devaney as well as their second under head coach Mike Riley. They will attempt to improve upon their 9–1 record from the previous season and make it to the USFL Championship Game after being knocked out in the first round of the playoffs last season.

Offseason

Stadium plans 
Shortly before the completion of the 2022 season, the USFL announced plans to move into two or four hubs for teams to play in. In November, the USFL was reportedly exploring options of having a hub in Metro Detroit, with possible locations being the Eastern Michigan Eagles' Rynearson Stadium and the Detroit Lions' Ford Field.

Draft 
The Generals clinched the sixth overall pick in the 2023 USFL Draft and hold the sixth pick in each round.

Staff

Roster

Schedule

Regular Season

Standings

References

New Jersey
New Jersey Generals
New Jersey Generals (2022)